The 1856 United States Senate election in Pennsylvania was held on January 14, 1856. William Bigler was elected by the Pennsylvania General Assembly to the United States Senate.

Background
The Pennsylvania General Assembly, consisting of the House of Representatives and the Senate, convened on February 13, 1855, for the regularly scheduled Senate election for the term beginning on March 4, 1855. Two ballots were recorded on February 13, followed by three on February 27, 1855. On the fifth and final ballot during this convention, former Senator Simon Cameron had led with 55 votes to future Senator Charles R. Buckalew's 23. No candidate was elected, however, and the hung election convention adjourned by a vote of 66 to 65. Upon the expiration of incumbent James Cooper's term on March 4, 1855, the seat was vacated and would remain vacant until William Bigler's election in January 1856.

Results
On January 14, 1856, the election convention of the General Assembly re-convened and elected Democratic former Governor of Pennsylvania William Bigler on the first ballot to serve the remainder of the term that began on March 4, 1855 and would expire on March 4, 1861. The results of the vote of both houses combined are as follows:

|-
|-bgcolor="#EEEEEE"
| colspan="3" align="right" | Totals
| align="right" | 133
| align="right" | 100.00%
|}

See also 
 United States Senate elections, 1856 and 1857

References

External links
Pennsylvania Election Statistics: 1682-2006 from the Wilkes University Election Statistics Project

1856
Pennsylvania
United States Senate
January 1856 events